Megalopyge brunneipennis is a moth of the family Megalopygidae. It was described by Schaus in 1905. It is found in Brazil.

The wingspan is 53 mm. The forewings are brown, the basal two-thirds with crinkly white scales along the costa, and transverse brownish streaks to the inner margin, and a dark brown spot at the end of the cell. The outer margin is broadly greyish brown without markings. The hindwings are greyish brown.

References

Moths described in 1905
Megalopygidae